The Da'naxda'xw Nation, or Da'naxda'xw/Awaetlatla Nation is a First Nation government in northern Vancouver Island in British Columbia, Canada, their main community is the community of Alert Bay, British Columbia in the Queen Charlotte Strait region. There are approximately 225 members of the Da'naxda'xw Nation. The Nation is a member of the Kwakiutl District Council and, for treaty negotiation purposes, the Winalagalis Treaty Group which includes three other members of the Kwakiutl District Council (the Quatsino First Nation, the Gwa'Sala-Nakwaxda'xw Nation, and the Tlatlasikwala Nation.

The Da'naxda'xw Aweatlata Nation were formerly known as the Tanakteuk First Nation (Tanakteuk is a different anglicization of Da'naxda'xw).

As of January 2019 the Da'naxda'xw Nation had no treaty with the Government of Canada or the government of British Columbia, however the nation is in stage 4 of 6 of Principle negotiations with the government of British Columbia. Previous agreements have been reached with the government of British Columbia including forestry and reconciliation agreements.

See also

Alert Bay, British Columbia
Kwakwaka'wakw
Kwak'wala (language)

References

External links
Da'naxda'xw Nation Home page
Winalagalis Treaty Group Home page
BC Treaty.net Da'naxda'xw Awaetlatla Nation information page
BC Treaty.net Home page

Kwakwaka'wakw governments
Central Coast of British Columbia